Berdella is a 2009 American  horror film written and directed by William Taft, and co-directed by Paul South. A limited theatrical release, it is based on the crimes of Robert Berdella, an American serial killer who raped, tortured, and murdered at least six men in Kansas City, Missouri during the 1980s. It stars Seth Correa as Berdella, and co-stars Marc Saleme, Vito Spino, and Steve Williams.

Plot 

Beginning in 1984 and ending in 1988, the film follows Robert Berdella, a homosexual bazaar owner and sexually sadistic serial killer who is introduced drunkenly bludgeoning Jimmy Hower, a man who Bob had been holding captive in the basement of his Kansas City home, 4315 Charlotte Street. Bob subsequently goes to work and skims pornographic magazines in the park, returning home afterward to sell drugs to his friend, Larry. Bob then invites over a drug addict, and slits the man's throat after he stumbles onto a file pertaining to Jimmy.

During a game of poker, Bob serves the other players chili that is implied to contain human remains, and later drugs, sexually assaults, and murders a yard worker named Mike Walton. The next day, Bob masturbates to photographs of his crimes, disposes of Walton's body, and heads out to tend to his shop, leaving a pair of junkies who he had been counseling alone in his house, which the two ransack, infuriating Bob.

After selling a victim's skull to an oblivious buyer, Bob visits a gay bar, where he entices one of the addicts who had earlier robbed into returning to 4315 Charlotte Street. There, Bob angrily tortures and mutilates the man, gouging out the junkie's eyes and going on a religious-themed rant before finally suffocating the addict with a plastic bag while repeatedly yelling, "You fucking robbed me!" Bob later bails Larry out of jail, and subjects him to similar torture and mutilation, eventually asphyxiating and decapitating him after lobotomizing him with a power drill and an injection of Drano.

Bob goes on to abduct a prostitute named Cliff, who he intends to condition into becoming his sex slave, keeping him tied up on the second floor of 4315 Charlotte Street. While at work, Bob begins suffering from chest pains after being attacked by a relative of Jimmy Hower. The film ends with Bob being informed that he will have to close his bazaar, and with Cliff escaping and begging a passing meter man to call 911. A series of intertitles state that Bob was arrested for murder, plea bargained his way out of a death sentence, and died of an apparent heart attack in 1992.

Cast

Release 

The film had a limited theatrical release in 2009, and was made available on DVD in 2010.

Reception 

Dread Central's Erik W. Van Der Wolf awarded the film a score of 3½ out of 5, and concluded, "Berdella is far from perfect and definitely looks like a low budget film in just about every aspect, but that didn't stop Taft and South from delivering something worth watching." Todd Martin of Horror News praised the film's cinematography and Seth Correa's performance, but otherwise found Berdella to be "so-so" and wrote, "while I didn't hate it I still didn't really see anything special about it that would make me want to watch it again either." Writing for The Pitch, Alan Scherstuhl condemned Berdella, deriding its "halfwit script, wretched acting, glib amorality, and inability to establish a clear relationship between the action that takes place in any one scene to whatever happens in the next."

References

External links 

 
 

2009 directorial debut films
2009 films
2009 horror films
2009 independent films
2009 LGBT-related films
2000s American films
2000s biographical films
2000s English-language films
2000s exploitation films
2000s psychological horror films
2000s serial killer films
American biographical films
American exploitation films
American films based on actual events
American independent films
American LGBT-related films
American psychological horror films
American serial killer films
American splatter films
Biographical films about LGBT people
Biographical films about serial killers
Crimes against sex workers in fiction
Cultural depictions of American men
Cultural depictions of kidnappers
Cultural depictions of male serial killers
Cultural depictions of rapists
Films about addiction
Films about adultery in the United States
Films about cannibalism
Films about domestic violence
Films about kidnapping in the United States
Films about male prostitution in the United States
Films about rape in the United States
Films about substance abuse
Films set in 1984
Films set in 1985
Films set in 1986
Films set in 1987
Films set in 1988
Films set in Kansas City, Missouri
Films shot in Missouri
Gay-related films
Horror films based on actual events
LGBT-related horror films
LGBT-related films based on actual events
Male bisexuality in film
Masturbation in fiction
Period horror films
Torture in films
English-language horror films